Mariana Mohammad is a road cyclist from Malaysia. She represented her nation at the 2010 UCI Road World Championships.

References

External links
 profile at Procyclingstats.com

Malaysian female cyclists
Living people
Place of birth missing (living people)
1978 births